Novy is a rural locality (a settlement) and the administrative center of Novoselskoye Rural Settlement, Kovrovsky District, Vladimir Oblast, Russia. The population was 877 as of 2010. There are 3 streets.

Geography 
Novy is located 10 km south of Kovrov (the district's administrative centre) by road. Babenki is the nearest rural locality.

References 

Rural localities in Kovrovsky District